The 2019 Orlando City B season is the club's third year of existence and their first returning from hiatus during the 2018 season. It is their first season as a founding member of USL League One, the third tier of the United States soccer pyramid, after moving from the second tier now rebranded as USL Championship in the restructuring. The team also moved from Orlando City Stadium where they spent the 2017 season, to Montverde Academy which already housed Orlando City's Development Academy.

On October 3, 2018, Fernando De Argila was announced as head coach. He had previously been head coach and director of methodology at the Soccer Institute at Montverde Academy (S.I.M.A).

Speaking in October, OCB General Manager Mike Potempa highlighted that the change of division would help shift the team's focus to providing a one-way stepping stone between the Development Academy and senior MLS side. Whereas the previous OCB incarnation had had a mix of youth and older veteran players with others also being loaned down from the MLS team, the new roster would contain "young players that need to play between the ages of 16 and 24" and that international players "need to be high, high-level players because you have seven spaces and you can’t get those wrong. We really have to be careful on our choices for the international spots.”

On July 25, De Argila was relieved of his head coaching duties with the team sitting at the bottom of the table and following a run of six defeats in seven games. Orlando City U19 head coach Roberto Sibaja was appointed interim manager until the end of the season.

Roster

Competitions

Friendlies

USL League One 

In November 2018, USL announced that the inaugural USL League One season would consist of ten teams competing in a single table with the league's regular season consisting of 28 games in which everyone will play eight teams three times and the remaining one club four times. The 2019 regular season kicked off the weekend of March 29–31 and concluded on the weekend of October 4–6. At the end of which, four teams progressed to the playoffs.

Results summary

Results by round

Match results

Table

U.S. Open Cup 

Due to their ownership by a more advanced level professional club, Orlando City B is one of 13 teams ineligible for the Cup competition.

Squad statistics

Appearances

Goalscorers

Shutouts

Disciplinary record

Player movement

Transfers in

Loans in

Transfers out

References 

Orlando City B
Orlando City B
Orlando City B seasons
Orlando City B